Autoroute 740 is a Quebec Autoroute in metropolitan Quebec City, Canada.

Originally named the Autoroute du Vallon for the 17th century road it replaced, in 2006, the Quebec government under then-Premier Jean Charest renamed the highway Autoroute Robert-Bourassa, in honour of a long serving former Quebec Premier.

Route description
The A-740 begins at an intersection with Route 175 (Also called Boulevard Laurier) in suburban Quebec City, tracing the western limits of Université Laval along the northbound lanes and Place Sainte-Foy (a regional shopping mall) along the southbound lanes. Once past the university, the A-740 enters a 300 m tunnel, passing under heavily travelled chemin Sainte-Foy and  chemin Quatre-Bourgeois. Passing to the west of Cégep de Sainte-Foy, the A-740 approaches the interchange with the A-440 at exit 4. From here, motorists on the A-440 can travel east (which becomes Boulevard Charest) towards the city centre or west to an interchange with the A-40 and A-73, affording access to Jean Lesage International Airport and points south and west.

Continuing north, the A-440 passes to the west of an industrial park, meets Route 138 at exit 7, then crosses the Saint-Charles River to an interchange with Boulevard Père-Lelièvre at exit 8 on the north shore. The autoroute provides the eastern boundary for a municipal park before meeting the A-40/A-73 (a concurrent route)  at a cloverleaf interchange. The A-740 ends shortly after the A-40/A-73 interchange, passing to the west of the Galeries de la Capitale (another regional shopping mall) to an intersection with Boulevard Lebourgneuf.

The original plans called for the A-740 to continue northward after the first section opened in 1982, and so the government preserved the autoroute's intended path. This new route was intended to provide an alternative to the heavily travelled Boulevard St. Jacques (which it parallels).

Exit list

References

External links 

A-740 at motorways-exits.com
A-740 at Quebec Autoroutes
Transports Quebec Map 

40-7
Streets in Quebec City